The 13th Parliament of Singapore was a meeting of the legislature of Singapore. The Parliament is unicameral – all Members of Parliament (MPs) make up a single chamber, and there is no senate or upper house. The Constitution of Singapore states that the Parliament of Singapore shall consist of eighty-nine members who are elected by the people, up to nine Non-constituency Members of Parliament (NCMPs) and up to nine Nominated Members of Parliament (NMPs), following changes to the Constitution enacted on 26 April 2010. After the 2015 general election, 89 MPs were elected and three NCMPs were appointed (or, in the terms of the Parliamentary Elections Act, declared elected) to Parliament. However, Lee Li Lian had decided not to accept the NCMP post, which Parliament would later resolve whether or not to fill the vacated seat.

Elected Members of Parliament

The names in bold (sorted according to alphabetical order) are the individuals' surnames, except for Indian and Malay persons, where personal names are indicated.

Koh Poh Koon is also Senior Minister of State in the Ministry of Trade and Industry.
Lee Hsien Loong is also the Prime Minister.
Chee Hong Tat is also Senior Minister of State in the Ministry of Trade and Industry and the Ministry of Education.
Ng Eng Hen is also the Minister for Defence.
Josephine Teo is also the Minister for Manpower and the Second Minister for Home Affairs.
Teo Ho Pin is also Mayor of the North West District.
Gan Kim Yong is also the Minister for Health.
Low Yen Ling is also Senior Parliamentary Secretary in the Ministry of Manpower and the Ministry of Education, as well as Mayor of the South West District.
Zaqy Mohamad is also Minister of State in the Ministry of National Development and the Ministry of Manpower.
Maliki Osman is also Senior Minister of State in the Ministry of Defence and the Ministry of Foreign Affairs, as well as Mayor of the South East District.
Sim Ann is also Senior Minister of State in the Ministry of Communications and Information and the Ministry of Culture, Community and Youth, as well as the Deputy Government Whip.
Vivian Balakrishnan is also the Minister for Foreign Affairs and the Minister-in-charge of Smart Nation.
Amy Khor is also Senior Minister of State in the Ministry of Health and the Ministry of the Environment and Water Resources.
Heng Chee How is also Senior Minister of State in the Ministry of Defence.
Denise Phua is also Mayor of the Central Singapore District.
Desmond Lee is also the Minister for Social and Family Development and the Second Minister for National Development, as well as the Deputy Leader of the House.
Tan Wu Meng is also Senior Parliamentary Secretary in the Ministry of Foreign Affairs and the Ministry of Trade and Industry.
Tharman Shanmugaratnam is also the Deputy Prime Minister and the Coordinating Minister for Economic and Social Policies.
Goh Chok Tong is conferred the title of Emeritus Senior Minister.
Edwin Tong is also Senior Minister of State in the Ministry of Health and the Ministry of the Environment and Water Resources.
Lawrence Wong is also the Minister for National Development and the Second Minister for Finance.
Lim Biow Chuan is also the Deputy Speaker of Parliament.
Faishal Ibrahim is also Senior Parliamentary Secretary in the Ministry of Education and the Ministry of Social and Family Development.
K Shanmugam is also the Minister for Home Affairs and the Minister for Law.
Janil Puthucheary is also Senior Minister of State in the Ministry of Communications and Information and the Ministry of Transport.
Sun Xueling is also Senior Parliamentary Secretary in the Ministry of Home Affairs and the Ministry of National Development.
Teo Chee Hean is also the Deputy Prime Minister and the Coordinating Minister for National Security.
Ng Chee Meng is also Minister in the Prime Minister's Office.
Charles Chong is also the Deputy Speaker of Parliament.
Sam Tan is also Minister of State in the Ministry of Social and Family Development and the Ministry of Foreign Affairs, as well as the Deputy Government Whip.
Amrin Amin is also Senior Parliamentary Secretary in the Ministry of Home Affairs and the Ministry of Health.
Khaw Boon Wan is also the Coordinating Minister for Infrastructure and the Minister for Transport.
Ong Ye Kung is also the Minister for Education.
Lam Pin Min is also Senior Minister of State in the Ministry of Health and the Ministry of Transport.
Baey Yam Keng is also Senior Parliamentary Secretary in the Ministry of Transport and the Ministry of Culture, Community and Youth.
Desmond Choo is also Mayor of the North East District.
Heng Swee Keat is also the Minister for Finance.
Masagos Zulkifli is also the Minister for the Environment and Water Resources and the Minister-in-charge of Muslim Affairs.
Chan Chun Sing is also the Minister for Trade and Industry and the Minister-in-charge of the Public Service Division, as well as the Government Whip.
Indranee Rajah is also Minister in the Prime Minister's Office, the Second Minister for Finance and the Second Minister for Education.
S Iswaran is also the Minister for Communications and Information and the Minister-in-charge of Trade Relations in the Ministry of Trade and Industry.
Grace Fu is also the Minister for Culture, Community and Youth and the Minister-in-charge of the Municipal Services Office, as well as the Leader of the House.

Non-constituency Members of Parliament

The names in bold (sorted according to alphabetical order) are the individuals' surnames.
Daniel Goh was separately elected as an NCMP on 4 February 2016.

Nominated Members of Parliament
The first table reflected consists of nine nominated members listed below were presented the instruments of appointment on 22 March 2016 and subsequently sworn in on 24 March 2016.

The names in bold (sorted according to alphabetical order) are the individuals' surnames, except for Indian and Malay persons, where personal names are indicated.

The nominated members listed below were the second batch of members who presented the instruments of appointment on 26 September 2018 and subsequently sworn in on 1 October 2018.

The names in bold (sorted according to alphabetical order) are the individuals' surnames, except for Indian and Malay persons, where personal names are indicated.

See also

2015 Singaporean general election
Constituencies of Singapore
Fourth Lee Hsien Loong Cabinet
Parliament of Singapore
Lists of members of parliament in Singapore

References

External links
 List of Current MPs, Parliament of Singapore
 Current MPs, Channel NewsAsia
 List of Former MPs, Parliament of Singapore

 
Lists of political office-holders in Singapore
Singapore